Operation Scylla was the transit of the  (Italian Royal Navy) Capitani Romani-class light cruiser  on the night of 17/18 July 1943, during the Second World War. The cruiser sailed from La Spezia in the Tyrrhenian Sea to Taranto in the Ionian Sea during the Allied invasion of Sicily.

Scipione Africano fought a night engagement against four British motor torpedo boats (MTBs) during its passage of the Strait of Messina. One MTB was destroyed and one damaged; Scipione Africano received superficial damage after being fired on by mistake by Axis coastal artillery. The action was the only time that an Italian warship made effective use of surface radar during an engagement in the war.

Background

Allied blockade of Sicily

During the Allied invasion of Sicily (Operation Husky, 9 July – 17 August 1943) British Motor Torpedo Boats (MTBs) and Motor Gun Boats moved from Algeria to Malta and then to captured ports in Sicily. The Axis withdrawal from Sicily ( to the Germans) took place from 3 to 17 August. The boats patrolled the Strait of Messina and laid in ambush, waiting for Axis ships and landing craft; with engines off, the British boat crews listened for ship engines. Lieutenant Denis Jermain, the senior officer of four boats of the 10th MTB Flotilla on patrol during the night of 17/18 July 1943 had decided that when attacking an Axis ship, one boat would act as a decoy, making as much noise as possible, for the other boats discreetly to move into positions to launch torpedoes.

The Italian Capitani Romani-class light cruiser  was one of four ships of the class to be built and was equipped with an EC-3   (Owl) radar set.  sets were Italian made and had come into service in early 1942. Scipione was based at La Spezia in the region of Liguria, on the north-western coast of Italy. When the Allied invasion of Sicily began, anticipating a blockade of the Strait of Messina by American and British naval forces, the  ordered the new light cruiser Scipione Africano (Captain Ernesto Pellegrini) to sail from La Spezia down the west coast of Italy to Taranto in Apulia, to remedy the lack of fast cruisers in the Ionian Sea.

Prelude

Operation Scylla
On 15 July 1943, Scipione departed La Spezia for Naples and arrived that evening, shadowed by a British seaplane. Scipione embarked an air liaison team and a Metox high-frequency radar warning receiver. She sailed again at 18:15 on 16 July and entered the Messina straits at 00:20 on 17 July, with a full moon rising from the south.

Night action

As she reached the straits, Scipione detected four small vessels on its  set, lying  ahead, between Reggio di Calabria and Cape Pellaro. At first Pellegrini thought that they were friendly  (motor barges).

The MTBs were four British Elco boats from the 10th MTB Flotilla (Lieutenant Dennis Jermain) based at Augusta, comprising MTB 260 (Lieutenant H. F. Wadds, R.A.N.V.R.), MTB 313 (Lieutenant Alec Foster), MTB 315 (Lieutenant L. E. Newall, R.N.Z.N.V.R.) and MTB 316 (Lieutenant R. B. Adams). The British MTBs were lying in wait for Axis landing craft and E-boats. Jermain, on MTB 315, wrote later,

Jermain gave the alarm and ordered the other boats to start up and scatter. Jermain intended to feint with MTB 315 to attract the attention of the cruiser and leave the other boats in a better position for attack.

Pellegrini had turned his ship to 200 degrees, heading to a point between MTB 313 and MTB 316. Scipione opened fire with all guns, with a precision that Pellegrini said "left him amazed". The Italian report claims that the engagement lasted no more than three minutes and that the first Allied craft to be hit by  rounds was the closest boat to starboard, which was left in a "sinking condition". This was MTB 313, only  distant from Scipione. MTB 313 was ready to launch torpedoes, when Foster was wounded in a leg and the spare officer of the flotilla, sub-lieutenant John McKim was mortally wounded. One torpedo passed just ahead of Scipione and the damaged MTB limped away.

MTB 260 was also on the starboard side of the cruiser and claimed a hit. After being fired on by Scipione, MTB 260 escaped with minor damage. The Italian report says that she was set on fire. The explosion took place so close to the cruiser that fragments of MTB 316 fell aboard Scipione. The analysis of these remains produced some controversy, when Italian sources claimed to have sunk MTB 305, which was not in the Mediterranean, because of an inscription from a recovered wooden panel.

Scipione was chased down the strait by MTB 315 and MTB 260 until she turned to port for Taranto. Pellegrini reported that one of the craft on the port side fired two torpedoes which Scipione evaded. The boat was MTB 315, which Scipione engaged with its heavy machine-guns. At the end of the action, Scipione was bombarded by German and Italian coastal artillery, which caused splinter damage and wounded two seamen. British sources recorded an air attack on Scipione by Axis aircraft, not mentioned by Pellegrino. Scipione reached Taranto at 09:46 on 18 July.

Aftermath

Subsequent operations

About an hour after Scipione passed the straits, the Italian submarine , escorted by the torpedo boat , reached Messina, also from La Spezia. Ambra was to attack Allied shipping at Syracuse with MT explosive motorboats (MTRs) on the night of 17/18 July but the operation was cancelled after the submarine was depth charged and damaged by a 221 Squadron Vickers Wellington; Ambra suffered no casualties and limped back to Messina. The morning after the action, Sub-Lieutenant McKim was buried at sea off Augusta. No traces of MTB 316 and her crew were found by Allied forces. The following night MTB 75 was hit and seriously damaged by shore batteries in the Straits of Messina, while on the evening of 19 July, an unidentified U-boat was depth-charged by British small units and had a narrow escape off Reggio di Calabria. From 4 to 17 August, Scipione laid four defensive minefields in the Gulf of Taranto and the Gulf of Squillace along with the old light cruiser . The day after the Cassibile armistice was made public, Scipione escorted the corvette , transporting the Italian royal family from Pescara to Brindisi where she came under German air attack. Scipione ferried the new head of government, General Pietro Badoglio and his cabinet to Malta.

See also 
 Gufo radar

References

Bibliography

Books
 
 
 
 
 
 
 
 
 
 
 

Journals
 
 

Newspapers
 

Websites

Further reading
 

Conflicts in 1943
Naval battles of World War II involving Italy
Naval battles and operations of World War II involving the United Kingdom
Italian naval victories in the battle of the Mediterranean
1943 in Italy
Friendly fire incidents of World War II
July 1943 events